Udhampur Assembly constituency is one of the 87 constituencies in the Jammu and Kashmir Legislative Assembly of Jammu and Kashmir a north state of India. Udhampur is also part of Udhampur Lok Sabha constituency.

Member of Legislative Assembly
 1962: Amar Nath Sharma, National Conference
 1967: H. Raj, Indian National Congress
 1972: Dev Datt, Indian National Congress
 1977: Shiv Charan Gupta, Independent
 1983: Balak Ram, Indian National Congress
 1987: Balak Ram, Indian National Congress
 1996: Shiv Charan Gupta, Bharatiya Janata Party
 2002: Balwant Singh Mankotia, Jammu and Kashmir National Panthers Party
 2008: Balwant Singh Mankotia, Jammu and Kashmir National Panthers Party

Election results

2014

See also
 Udhampur
 Udhampur district
 List of constituencies of Jammu and Kashmir Legislative Assembly

References

Assembly constituencies of Jammu and Kashmir
Udhampur